Domenico Di Cecco (born 20 May 1983) is an Italian football coach and a former player who played as a midfielder. He is an assistant coach with Fidelis Andria.

Biography

Chieti
Born in Lanciano, the Province of Chieti, Di Cecco started his career in the provincial capital.

Chievo & Avellino
After the club bankrupted in 2006, Italian Serie A team Chievo signed Di Cecco on free transfer but immediately returned to Italian Serie C1 for Avellino with option to purchase for €500. In August 2007 Chievo excised the bought-back option for €20,000 (by selling Carbone and Mengoni) but renewed the temporary deal. Avellino relegated but re-admitted back to 2008–09 Serie B in the summer 2008, and renewed Di Cecco's loan.

Lanciano
In July 2009 Di Cecco was sold back to hometown club Lanciano in co-ownership deal as the contract was running out. On 25 June 2010 Chievo sold the remains 50% registration rights to Lanciano.

On 30 August 2011 Di Cecco was loaned to Barletta.

Catania
Catania signed Di Secco on 5 January 2016.

References

External links
 Football.it Profile 
 Barletta Profile 
 

Italian footballers
Serie B players
Serie C players
Serie D players
S.S. Chieti Calcio players
U.S. Avellino 1912 players
S.S. Virtus Lanciano 1924 players
A.S.D. Barletta 1922 players
Association football midfielders
People from Lanciano
1983 births
Living people
Footballers from Abruzzo
Italian football managers
Sportspeople from the Province of Chieti